Hugh Francis McAuley (born 13 May 1976) is an English former professional footballer who played as a midfielder. He made 104 appearances in the Football League for Cheltenham Town and Kidderminster Harriers.

He also played for Northwich Victoria, Conwy United, Southport, Leek Town, Forest Green Rovers, Aldershot Town, Tamworth, Kettering Town, Hucknall Town and Leigh RMI. McAuley's father, Hugh, made 205 appearances in the Football League for Tranmere Rovers, Plymouth Argyle, Charlton Athletic and Carlisle United.

McAuley is a director of The Innovation Group, a customised luxury car sourcing company. The company is the sponsor of the football team McAuley and co-director Dave Webster co-own, and that McAuley's father Hughie once played for, Formby F.C. In May 2012 McAuley's company agreed a three-year, six figure sponsorship deal with FA WSL club Doncaster Rovers Belles.

References

External links

1977 births
Living people
Footballers from Plymouth, Devon
English footballers
Association football midfielders
Cymru Premier players
Liverpool F.C. players
Northwich Victoria F.C. players
Southport F.C. players
Leek Town F.C. players
Cheltenham Town F.C. players
Kidderminster Harriers F.C. players
Forest Green Rovers F.C. players
Aldershot Town F.C. players
Tamworth F.C. players
Kettering Town F.C. players
Hucknall Town F.C. players
Leigh Genesis F.C. players
English Football League players
National League (English football) players
Conwy Borough F.C. players